The Fraser of Allander Institute, abbreviated to FAI, is an independent research unit and part of the Department of Economics at the University of Strathclyde. It specialises in researching the Scottish economy.

The FAI covers a number of primary areas of research, including the Scottish economy, macroeconomic modelling, fiscal analysis, energy and climate change, the labour market and standard of living analysis. It regularly publishes analysis on its blog which receives widespread media coverage. The FAI is impartial and its research has been used by both sides of the political spectrum in the Scottish Parliament.

The director of the institute is Professor Graeme Roy, a former Senior Economic Adviser and head of the First Minister's Policy Unit under Nicola Sturgeon.

History 
The Fraser of Allander Institute was formed by the University of Strathclyde in 1975. Its primary goal is to research the Scottish economy. It is based in Glasgow, Scotland.

From 2017, Deloitte announced that they would be acting as the main sponsor of the Fraser of Allander Institute Economic Commentary.

Research overview

Commentary 
Due to the independent position of the research institute, it has no bias towards any political agendas or parties. FAI research has been used by both sides of the political spectrum in Scottish Parliament.

Since 1975, the Fraser of Allander Institute has produced a quarterly economic commentary on Scotland. The Fraser of Allander Institute Economic Commentary provides an analysis of current economic performance, as well as examining future opportunities and risks within the Scottish economy. This includes forecasts for both the labour market and economic growth, as well as a section on government policy.

The economic commentary is also used as a platform by leading experts in academia and other sectors to share their research in the Economic Perspectives section.

Since 2016, the FAI has published a yearly report, studying the Scottish budget. The research analyses the effect of economic, budgetary and policy changes on the Scottish economy. This report receives widespread media and political coverage. 

The FAI also produces a regular report studying the performance of the Scottish labour market.

Surveys 
The FAI, in partnership with the Scottish Chamber of Commerce, is responsible for producing the Quarterly Economic Indicator Survey. It is considered the longest running survey of the Scottish economy. It studies a number of business trends in the Scottish economy, such as optimism, sales and investment, and examines individual sectors within the Scottish economy. Each quarter, various newspapers and publications cover the economic survey as an indicator of general economic performance in Scotland.

The FAI also produces the Scottish Business monitor on a quarterly basis in partnership with the Royal Bank of Scotland. The Scottish Business Monitor examines a range of business indicators including volume of business, turnover, investment and export activity. It is frequently mentioned in both Scottish and UK-wide press.

In partnership with Aberdeen & Grampian Chamber of Commerce, the FAI also produces a quarterly report into the oil & gas industry in Scotland.

Allander series 
The Allander series was produced by the FAI to study the economic future of Scotland. The series has had contributions from a number of notable economists. These have included Heather Joshi, Robert E. Wright and Nicholas Crafts. Other notable contributors include James Heckman and Paul Krugman, both winners of the Nobel prize in Economics, as well as William Baumol who was shortlisted for the Nobel prize in Economics.

The series has led to a number of publications, research papers, a lecture series and literature specialising in the regional context. The content from the series has contributed to building various economic models and strategies, including the Scottish government's economic strategy.

Notable outputs 
In March 2018, the FAI released its economic commentary on the Scottish economy. The commentary's criticism of the ‘cluttered policy landscape’ within the Scottish Government was debated in Parliament and also received global press coverage.

Commissioned works

Specialist research 
In 2014, the FAI produced a paper studying the links between constitutional change and inequality affected Scotland. It was published in the Oxford Review of Economic Policy.

Following the Brexit vote, the FAI carried out research into the potential effects of Brexit on different sectors within the Scottish economy. The study covered the various outcomes of Brexit and how it could affect Scotland. A bad outcome for Scotland could result in a reduction in GDP of £8 billion, jobs by 80,000 and wages an average of £2,000 per year. While the report showed that a Hard Brexit could lead to problems, it was stated that some sectors in Scotland would fare quite well, when compared to the rest of the UK. In August 2018, the FAI has published a survey of Scottish businesses on their preparations for Brexit. The survey found that 44% of the Scottish businesses had noted a negative impact since the referendum on European Union membership.

Consultancy projects 
The FAI studied the economic impact of college graduates in Scotland. The research showed that colleges could generate £20 billion for the Scottish economy.

In March 2018, the FAI was commissioned to research the economic impact of the commercial property sector on the Scottish economy. According to the data the sector contributed £2.4 billion to the Scottish economy.

The FAI have also studied the economic impact of the pharmaceutical sector in Scotland.

Notable personnel

Current staff 

 Professor Graeme Roy
 Dr Grant Allan
 Dr David Eiser
 Professor Peter McGregor
 Mairi Spowage
 Dr Stuart McIntyre
 Dr Katherine Trebeck

Advisory committee 

 Professor David Bell
 Dr Gary Gillespie
Professor Andrew Goudie
Professor John Kay
Lady Susan Rice
Professor Frances Ruane
Dr Jim Walker
Professor Martin Weale

References

External links 

 The Scottish Policy Foundation
 Economic Statistics Centre of Excellence

Economic research institutes
Fiscal policy
Renewable energy in Scotland
Economy of Aberdeen
Economy of Edinburgh
University of Strathclyde